Firuzabad is a village in the municipality of Üçtəpə in the Goygol Rayon of Azerbaijan. The city was established by Sassanian king, Khosrow II in the early 7th century.

References

Populated places in Goygol District